Shadows Over Naples is a 1951 German-Italian crime film directed by Hans Wolff and starring Maria Montez, Massimo Serato, and Hans Söhnker. A separate Italian version Love and Blood was also released.

Cast

References

Bibliography

External links 
 

1951 films
1951 crime drama films
German crime drama films
West German films
1950s German-language films
Films directed by Hans Wolff
Films set in Italy
Films set in Naples
Films about the Camorra
German multilingual films
Films scored by Renzo Rossellini
German black-and-white films
1950s German films
1950s multilingual films